Ansfrid, Ansfrit, or Ausfrid was the Duke of Friuli in 694. He was originally the lord of the castle of Ragogna. 

In 694, he attacked Friuli and forced Duke Rodoald to flee to King Cunipert. Ansfrid then rebelled against the king in an attempt to make himself sovereign. He invaded Verona, but was there captured and brought before the king. He was blinded and exiled. Rodoald's brother Ado was invested in the Friulian dukedom.

Sources
Paul the Deacon. Historia Langobardorum. Translated by William Dudley Foulke. University of Pennsylvania: 1907.
Hodgkin, Thomas. Italy and her Invaders. Clarendon Press: 1895.

7th-century births
Dukes of Friuli
7th-century Lombard people
7th-century rulers in Europe
Year of death unknown